News satire or news comedy is a type of parody presented in a format typical of mainstream journalism, and called a satire because of its content. News satire has been around almost as long as journalism itself, but it is particularly popular on the web, with websites like The Onion and The Babylon Bee, where it is relatively easy to mimic a legitimate news site. News satire relies heavily on irony and deadpan humor.

Two slightly different types of news satire exist. One form uses satirical commentary and sketch comedy to comment on real-world events, while the other presents wholly fictionalized news stories.

In history 

Author Samuel Clemens (Mark Twain) was employed as a newspaper reporter before becoming famous as a novelist, and in this position he published many satirical articles. He left two separate journalism positions, Nevada (1864) fleeing a challenge to duel and San Francisco fleeing outraged police officials because his satire and fiction were often taken for the truthful accounts they were presented as. Ironically, the accuracy of many newspaper and autobiographical accounts used to follow the early life of Samuel Clemens is in doubt.

Newspapers still print occasional news satire features, in particular on April Fools' Day. This news is specifically identified somewhere in the paper or in the next day as a joke.

In 1933 and 1934, Metro-Goldwyn-Mayer released a series of ten one-reel theatrical shorts called Goofy Movies, which included "Wotaphony Newsreel", a newsreel parody that paired actual footage with a mocking, deadpan narration.

Also in 1934, halfway through a Kraft Music Hall radio show, Dean Taylor ("Others collect the news, Dean makes it!") narrated a fake newsreel which began with a report on the New York Giants and Philadelphia Phillies being cancelled due to bad weather, and baseball season being rescheduled to when farmers need rain.

On television

News satire has been prevalent on television since the 1960s, when it enjoyed a renaissance in the UK with the "Satire Boom", led by comedians including Peter Cook, Alan Bennett, Jonathan Miller, David Frost, Eleanor Bron, and Dudley Moore, and the television program That Was The Week That Was. In the United States, the NBC network adapted this program and also produced its own content, from the "news" segment of Rowan and Martin's Laugh-In, to the still-running Saturday Night Live mock newscast segment "Weekend Update". Cable television got into the cable news act with Home Box Office's Not Necessarily the News in the mid-1980s.

In the 2000s, Comedy Central's The Daily Show became an icon of the American political satire genre, as Jon Stewart delved into opinionated political criticism. Its spinoff, Stephen Colbert's The Colbert Report, also enjoyed a high level of popularity during its 9-year run.

The 2004 National Annenberg Election Survey found that Daily Show viewers were better informed than those who relied solely on conventional network news, and Steven Young of Los Angeles Daily News compares the trust and influence that long-time host Jon Stewart enjoyed to that of CBS anchor Walter Cronkite in the 1970s. However, a study published in the Journal of Communication suggests that news entertainment shows such as The Daily Show or The Colbert Report may not be as influential in teaching voters about political issues and candidates as was previously thought. Researchers from Ohio State University have found reasons to discount how effective these shows are in informing the general public. People watching television news learned more about a candidate's position on issues and about political procedures compared to those watching the news entertainment shows, while news entertainment shows primarily taught viewers about a candidate’s personal background.

After the success of The Daily Show, Fox News launched its own news satire program in February 2007 with the title of The 1/2 Hour News Hour. Its creator describes it as "The Daily Show for conservatives", but it was canceled within a few months. Fox News then launched the more successful series Red Eye which ran from February 6, 2007 to April 7, 2017. As of 2017, news satire in the United States remains popular, especially in late night television; late-night talk shows often incorporate elements of news satire. Current American programs known primarily for their news satire include those hosted by former correspondents for The Daily Show (John Oliver's Last Week Tonight, Samantha Bee's Full Frontal, and The Daily Show itself under Trevor Noah's tenure), as well as Bill Maher's Real Time.

In Britain, several news satires have been created, most famously the works of Chris Morris. Shows such as the radio series On the Hour and its television version The Day Today parodied news programs very accurately, so they were almost believable and could have been confused with actual news programs, if it was not for the fake stories reported. Morris went on to continue this and several other themes in Brass Eye, one of the most controversial series on British television, especially after one episode broadcast mocked the way the news covered stories about pedophilia. Previous news satire shows in Britain include: The Late Edition with Marcus Brigstocke, on digital station BBC Four, which was heavily influenced by The Daily Show; News Knight with Sir Trevor McDonald, which parodied news differently by using an actual newsreader as the host; and Broken News, which featured several sketches of different news channels blending into each other.

As of 2018, current British news-related programs that have been described as satire include: Have I Got News for You and Mock the Week on the BBC; Channel 4's The Last Leg; ITV's Newzoids; and Dave's Unspun with Matt Forde.

Recent news satire television series in Australia include Working Dog Productions' Frontline, Shaun Micallef's Newstopia, and the many programs created by The Chaser since 2001. As of 2017, current programs of the Australian Broadcasting Corporation include Shaun Micallef's Mad as Hell and The Weekly with Charlie Pickering.

In Canada, This Hour Has 22 Minutes is an ensemble news satire show with four anchors on CBC. The Rick Mercer Report is a spinoff of 22 Minutes with former anchor Rick Mercer, and is also shown on CBC. CBC Radio One features This Is That, an improvised news satire program which mimics the style of actual CBC Radio public affairs programs. The 1960s series This Hour Has Seven Days, although primarily a real newsmagazine, included some satirical features in its format, such as political humor songs by actress and singer Dinah Christie. On French-language television networks in Quebec, noted news satire shows have included La Fin du monde est à 7 heures, Et Dieu créa... Laflaque and Infoman. 

In Germany, heute-show (ZDF), and formerly Wochenshow (on SAT.1) and Freitag Nacht News (on RTL) are popular news satires on TV.

The Egyptian show El Bernameg, hosted by Bassem Youssef (on Capital Broadcast Center 2011-13 and MBC MASR from 2014 on), is modeled on The Daily Show. Launched in the wake of the Egyptian Revolution of 2011, it has been quite popular, but also a source of tremendous controversy, as Youssef has repeatedly been under investigation by the authorities for his willingness to poke fun at powerful people.

In France, Rendez-Vous avec Kevin Razy on Canal+ hosted by the comedian Kévin Razy between 2017 and 2019 was modeled on Last Week Tonight and 'The Tonight Show' with a band.

Online
News satire has been posted on the web almost since its inception, with The Onion foremost among recognized news satire sites due to its enduring and profitable business model. The content of the website, which started in 1996, is syndicated through mainstream media sites such as CNN and CNET. Today there are hundreds of news satire sites online, among which The Babylon Bee, considered the politically conservative counterpart of The Onion and also the more visited of the two. Sites such as Hollywood Leek specialize in satirical articles about celebrities and Hollywood entertainment news. Sometimes fake news reporters influence real world politics, like Citizen Kate whose 90 episodes covered the 2008 presidential campaign trail. She commissioned a butter bust of Obama presented to him by the Butter Cow Lady of Iowa, making international headlines. El Koshary Today is an Egyptian website that carries fake international news stories. Other satire sites attempt to emulate a genuine news source of some sort; these sites now take a variety of forms. 

Because interesting stories are often emailed and can quickly become separated from their point of origin, it is not uncommon for news satire stories to be picked up as real by the media, as happened with a Faking News story about a lawsuit against Axe by an Indian man after having failed to attract a girl. Additionally, a parody post on Al Sharpton's parody News Groper blog was quoted as if real by MSNBC. Another satire publication, The Giant Napkin, published an article about a man literally fighting his house fire with more fire, a story taken seriously by several social networking sites. That Google News accepts news satire sources helps contribute to this phenomenon; while Google News does mark such stories with a "satire" tag, not all readers notice the tag; moreover, sometimes satirical sources may not carry the tag. At least one site, thespoof.com, relies on user-generated content in a Web 2.0 manner.

Some websites like Literally Unbelievable post the genuine and shocked reactions of individuals who believe the satirical articles are real. The reactions are taken from social media websites, such as Facebook, in which users can directly comment on links to the article's source.

Multi-author Indian website News That Matters Not, launched in November 2009, won a Manthan South Asia Award for socially responsible e-content (Digital Inclusion for Development), organized by Digital Empowerment Foundation. In India, several community-based news satire websites have crept up in recent times. Their popularity on Facebook defines that they are popular amongst the masses. Very new websites such as The Scoop Times, Fakekhabar.com, Sunkey.co.in and The UnReal Times also claim to be run by students, and were covered in The Times of India in July 2011.

A plethora of news satire sites participate in a hosted community site, which additionally runs its own satire news feed on HumorFeed. HumorFeed is notable for its relatively high standards of admission and active community involvement. At present, over 60 sites are contributing members, at least eight of which have published books and two of which publish regular hard-copy periodicals. Several HumorFeed members also run Check Please!, an online journal devoted to the serious examination of online satire, ranging from its role in relation to actual journalism to practical considerations of producing an online satire site.

In July 2009, a satire piece about Kanye West published on the website ScrapeTV was picked up by numerous media outlets and reported as factual, despite disclaimers on the site.

Satirical Twitter accounts of news sources are popular, and they are often mistaken as legitimate sources. Online publications have made quizzes challenging users to distinguish between the tweets of the real Vice and the tweets of their parodies. The @Salondotcom parody account confused so many Twitter users that the real Salon.com reported them for impersonation.

In Pakistan, Khabaristan Times (KT) is a renowned satire and parody website with its commentary on Pakistani politics and the military. In 2015, a satirical piece by the website went viral and international media outlets including New York Times reported the story as if it were true. In 2017, KT was reportedly blocked in Pakistan, however, it appeared to be available to users outside Pakistan.

In the Middle East, The Pan-Arabia Enquirer is the most widely read satirical news website. It gained notoriety in 2013 when an article about Emirates launching shisha lounges on its fleet of A380s was picked up as fact by news websites around the world. AlHudood, another middle eastern satire news publisher, has gained publicity in the region when they published an article about the Jordanian police arresting Santa Claus and confiscating all of his gifts for not paying the customs before entering Jordan.

In Turkey, Zaytung has become a source of mass reading since the socio-political Gezi Park 2013 protests in Turkey.

In the Caribbean, Trinidad and Tobago-based website Wired868 has two satirical columnists under the pseudonyms Mr Live Wire and Filbert Street, who comment satirically on relevant political and news stories such as the fall from power of ex-FIFA vice-president Jack Warner, media issues, general news and the challenges faced by former Prime Minister Kamla Persad-Bissessar and her People's Partnership coalition Government.

In Australia, there are numerous satirical news websites including The Damascus Dropbear (Christian satire), The Shovel, The Betoota Advocate, The (Un)Australian, The Fault Report, The Sauce and The Tunnel Presents. The Shovel mainly satirizes the Australian political and social culture and The Betoota Advocate satirizes the political right and Australian journalism. In February 2015, The Betoota Advocate shot to fame after the publication's editor's sneaked in to the media scrum outside Parliament House in Canberra during a leadership spill motion and managed to interview some of Australia's most high-profile media personalities and politicians, posing as legitimate journalists. The fallout from The Betoota Advocate stunt has led to a security increase surrounding parliamentary media and screening of all crew. The Fault Report  was established in 2014 and also has a political editorial focus. British-born Australian author John Birmingham once described The Fault Report as, "Like The Onion. But with Vegemite", on his blog Cheeseburger Gothic. The Tunnel Presents, which has been online since June 2011, is by Brisbane-based satire writing team The Tunnel and has political and social satire stories with a Queensland focus.

In Italy, the most famous website specialized in mock-journalism is Lercio. Born as a parody of the popular press, but in addition to the tabloid press, its goals are also the domestic and foreign politics. The website was created in the 2012 and the editorial staff is composed of authors who have contributed to La Palestra, a column wanted on his blog by the comedian and satirical author Daniele Luttazzi. In few years Lercio saw the publication of a book with a collection of 2014 best articles. From the same year Lercio it is present on the national radio with a daily strip. Thanks to the many fans the articles are shared on the social network with a good success and, mostly in the beginning of his history, some articles were taken as true by the national press.

In Hungary, HírCsárda is the number one news satire medium. The site, started in 2010, has drawn public attention after the Hungarian government demanded that an article should be emended that dealt with the then state secretary of education Rózsa Hoffmann. The page has since been threatened by various celebrities, but has remained active regardless. Also present in Hungary is Központi Újság (Central News), a news satire website of the joke party. :)Hungarian Two-tailed Dog Party.

Popular Canadian satirical news websites include The Beaverton, The Daily Bonnet, and Walking Eagle News.

See also
 List of satirical television news programs
 List of satirical news websites
 List of satirical magazines

References

Criticism of journalism
Satirical publications
Satirical websites
Satire